In 1790, Pope Pius VI entirely revised the ecclesiastical map of France to fit the new administrative map: dioceses were now to coincide with departments (the new administrative units), and consequently all Ancien Régime dioceses disappeared. Many former bishoprics remained heads of the new dioceses, but many cities lost their bishop. But the papacy did not accept those changes, and for more than a decade, the new French ecclesiastical hierarchy was technically in schism with Rome.

In 1801, following the Concordate First Consul Napoleon Bonaparte signed with Pope Pius VI, a compromise was found, but it was not before the late 1810s that a stable ecclesiastical organisation was reached, in which one diocese was more or less coterminous with one department. A few exceptions were retained, especially in departments where there was a particularly numerous population.

In December 2002, Pope John Paul II completely redrew the map of French ecclesiastical provinces: for this, see the post-2002 List of the Roman Catholic dioceses of France.

The following is a list of French ecclesiastical provinces and dioceses from 1825 to 2002. Except where stated, one diocese coincided with one department.

Province of Aix 
Archdiocese of Aix = Bouches-du-Rhône, minus the arrondissement of Marseille
Diocese of Ajaccio = Haute-Corse and Corse-du-Sud
Diocese of Digne = Alpes-de-Haute-Provence
Diocese of Fréjus = Var
Diocese of Gap = Hautes-Alpes
Diocese of Nice = Alpes-Maritimes

Province of Albi 
Archdiocese of Albi = Tarn
Diocese of Cahors = Lot
Diocese of Mende = Lozère
Diocese of Perpignan = Pyrénées-Orientales
Diocese of Rodez = Aveyron

Province of Auch 
Archdiocese of Auch = Gers
Diocese of Aire-et-Dax = Landes
Diocese of Bayonne = Pyrénées-Atlantiques
Diocese of Tarbes, renamed as Diocese of Tarbes-et-Lourdes in 1912 = Hautes-Pyrénées

Province of Avignon 
Archdiocese of Avignon = Vaucluse
Diocese of Montpellier = Hérault
Diocese of Nîmes = Gard
Diocese of Valence = Drôme
Diocese of Viviers = Ardèche

Province of Besançon 
Archdiocese of Besançon = originally Doubs
Diocese of Belfort-Montbéliard, detached from Besançon in 1979 = Territoire de Belfort and arrondissement of Montbéliard in the département of the Doubs
Diocese of Nancy = originally Meurthe; after 1871, Meurthe-et-Moselle
Diocese of Saint-Claude = Jura
Diocese of Saint-Dié = Vosges
Diocese of Verdun = Meuse

Province of Bordeaux 
Archdiocese of Bordeaux = Gironde
Diocese of Agen = Lot-et-Garonne
Diocese of Angoulême = Charente
Diocese of La Rochelle = Charente-Maritime
Diocese of Luçon = Vendée
Diocese of Périgueux = Dordogne
Diocese of Poitiers = Vienne and Deux-Sèvres

Province of Bourges 
Archdiocese of Bourges = Cher and Indre
Diocese of Blois = Loir-et-Cher
Diocese of Chartres = Eure-et-Loir
Diocese of Clermont = Puy-de-Dôme
Diocese of Le Puy-en-Velay = Haute-Loire
Diocese of Limoges = Haute-Vienne and Creuse
Diocese of Orléans = Loiret
Diocese of Saint-Flour = Cantal
Diocese of Tulle = Corrèze

Province of Cambrai 
Archdiocese of Cambrai = originally Nord
Diocese of Lille, detached from Cambrai in 1913 = arrondissements of Lille and Dunkerque
Diocese of Arras = Pas-de-Calais

Province of Chambéry 
Archdiocese of Chambéry, Maurienne, and Tarentaise = Savoie
Diocese of Annecy = Haute-Savoie

Province of Lyon 
Archdiocese of Lyon = originally Rhône and Loire
Diocese of Saint-Étienne, detached from Lyon in 1970 = Loire, minus the arrondissement of Roanne
Diocese of Autun = Saône-et-Loire
Diocese of Belley, renamed as Belley-Ars in 1888 = Ain
Diocese of Dijon = Côte-d'Or
Diocese of Grenoble = Isère
Diocese of Langres = Haute-Marne

Province of Paris 
Archdiocese of Paris = Originally, département of the Seine, now only the City-département of Paris
Diocese of Créteil, detached from Paris in 1966 = Val-de-Marne
Diocese of Nanterre, detached from Paris in 1966 = Hauts-de-Seine
Diocese of Saint-Denis-en-France, detached from Paris in 1966 = Seine-Saint-Denis
Diocese of Versailles = Yvelines
Diocese of Évry–Corbeil-Essonnes, detached from Versailles in 1965 = Essonne
Diocese of Pontoise, detached from Versailles in 1966 = Val-d'Oise
Diocese of Meaux = Seine-et-Marne

Province of Reims 
Archdiocese of Reims = département of the Ardennes and arrondissement of Reims in the département of the Marne
Diocese of Amiens = Somme
Diocese of Beauvais = Oise
Diocese of Châlons-en-Champagne = Marne, minus the arrondissement of Reims
Diocese of Soissons = Aisne

Province of Rennes 
(detached from Tours in 1859)
Archdiocese of Rennes = Ille-et-Vilaine
Diocese of Quimper = Finistère
Diocese of Saint-Brieuc = Côtes-d'Armor
Diocese of Vannes = Morbihan

Province of Rouen 
Archdiocese of Rouen = originally the whole of Seine-Maritime
Diocese of Le Havre, detached from Rouen in 1974 = arrondissement of Le Havre in Seine-Maritime
Diocese of Bayeux and Lisieux = Calvados
Diocese of Coutances and Avranches = Manche
Diocese of Évreux = Eure
Diocese of Sées = Orne

Province of Sens 
 Archdiocese of Sens and Auxerre = Yonne
 Diocese of Moulins = Allier
 Diocese of Nevers = Nièvre
 Diocese of Troyes = Aube

Province of Toulouse 
Archdiocese of Toulouse = Haute-Garonne
Diocese of Montauban = Tarn-et-Garonne
Diocese of Pamiers = Ariège
Diocese of Carcassonne = Aude

Province of Tours 
 Metropolitan Archdiocese of Tours = Indre-et-Loire
 Diocese of Angers = Maine-et-Loire
 Diocese of Le Mans = originally Sarthe and Mayenne
Diocese of Laval, detached from Le Mans in 1855 = Mayenne
 Diocese of Nantes = Loire-Atlantique

Under the direct authority of the Holy See 
Diocese of Marseille = arrondissement of Marseille in the Bouches-du-Rhône département
Diocese of Metz = Moselle
Diocese of Strasbourg = Bas-Rhin and Haut-Rhin

Overseas ecclesiastical provinces

Antilles-Guyane 
(province created in 1867)
Archdiocese of Fort-de-France and Saint-Pierre, created in 1850 = Martinique
Diocese of Basse-Terre and Pointe-à-Pitre, created in 1850 = Guadeloupe
Diocese of Cayenne, created in 1956 = French Guiana

Under the direct authority of the Holy See 
Saint-Denis-de-la-Réunion, created in 1850 = Réunion

Papeete 
(province created in 1966)
Archdiocese of Papeete, created in 1966 = French Polynesia, minus the Marquesas Islands
Diocese of Taiohae o Tefenuaenata, created in 1966 = Marquesas Islands

Nouméa 
(province created in 1966)
Archdiocese of Nouméa, created in 1966 = New Caledonia
Diocese of Wallis-et-Futuna, created in 1966 = Wallis-et-Futuna

History of Catholicism in France
 
French dioceses in the 19th and 20th century
Dioceses in the 19th and 20th century
Catholic dioceses